Pontotoc Ridge is a ridge in the U.S. state of Mississippi.

Pontotoc  is a name derived from the Choctaw language purported to mean "hanging grapes".

References

Ridges of Mississippi
Landforms of Pontotoc County, Mississippi
Mississippi placenames of Native American origin